Black cockatoo is a general descriptive term for cockatoos that are mainly black and may include:

Palm cockatoo, Probosciger aterrimus, also called great black cockatoo
Species of the genus Calyptorhynchus:
Red-tailed black cockatoo, Calyptorhynchus banksii, has several alternative common names including black cockatoo
Glossy black cockatoo, Calyptorhynchus lathami
Species of the genus Zanda:
Yellow-tailed black cockatoo, Zanda funereus
Carnaby's black cockatoo, Zanda latirostris
Baudin's black cockatoo, Zanda baudinii

Bird common names